Albert Edward Negratti (June 12, 1921 – January 19, 1998) was an American basketball player, coach, and college athletics administrator. He played professionally for one season, 1946–47, in the Basketball Association of America (BAA) as a member of the Washington Capitols. Negratti attended Seton Hall University, where played college basketball.  Negratti served as the head basketball coach at the University of Portland from 1955 to 1967, compiling a record of 163–156.  Negratti died of cancer on January 19, 1998, at his home in Green Bay, Wisconsin.

BAA career statistics

Regular season

References

External links
 

1921 births
1998 deaths
American men's basketball players
Centers (basketball)
College men's basketball head coaches in the United States
Deaths from cancer in Wisconsin
Merchant Marine Mariners athletic directors
Milwaukee Panthers athletic directors
Portland Pilots athletic directors
Portland Pilots men's basketball coaches
Power forwards (basketball)
Rochester Royals players
Seton Hall Pirates men's basketball players
St. Norbert Green Knights athletic directors
UC Santa Barbara Gauchos athletic directors
UNLV Rebels athletic directors
Washington Capitols players